Culex jenseni is a species of mosquito in the genus Culex.  It is endemic to Sabah, Malaysian Borneo. C. jenseni is placed in the subgenus Lophoceraomyia.  In its larval stage, C. jenseni develops in the pitchers of Nepenthes species, especially N. rajah. As such, it is considered a nepenthebiont.

References
 Two New Mosquito Species from a Pitcher Plant of Mt. Kinabalu, Sabah, Malaysia
 Clarke, C.M. 1997. Nepenthes of Borneo.  Natural History Publications (Borneo), Kota Kinabalu,! p. 39.

jenseni
Insects described in 1910
Nepenthes infauna